Harbison v. Bell, 556 U.S. 180 (2009), was a decision by the Supreme Court of the United States that held that federal law gave indigent death row inmates the right to federally appointed counsel to represent them in post-conviction state clemency proceedings, when the state has declined to do so. Certiorari was granted by the Supreme Court on June 23, 2008.

Opinion 
Justice Stevens delivered the judgment of the court, stating:

Subsequent developments 
The death sentence of Edward Harbison was commuted to life imprisonment without parole by Tennessee Governor Phil Breseden in January 2011, shortly before Breseden left office.

Justice Scalia dissented in substance:

See also 
 List of United States Supreme Court decisions on capital punishment

References

External links
 
 Harbison v. Bell at SCOTUS blog

United States Supreme Court cases
United States death penalty case law
2009 in United States case law
United States Supreme Court cases of the Roberts Court
Capital punishment in Tennessee